The 2013–14 Bowling Green Falcons men's basketball team  represented Bowling Green State University during the 2013–14 NCAA Division I men's basketball season. The Falcons, led by seventh year head coach Louis Orr, played their home games at the Stroh Center as members of the East Division of the Mid-American Conference. They finished the season 12–20, 6–12 in MAC play to finish in last place in the East Division. They lost in the first round of the MAC tournament to Northern Illinois.

Season

Preseason
The Falcons announced their full season schedule on September 3, 2013. Key non-conference games included a trip to the Cancún Challenge to face teams such as Wisconsin and Saint Louis. Another key non-conference game was a trip to Xavier. For the MAC schedule, the Falcons schedule home-and-home series with Eastern Michigan, Kent State, Toledo, Buffalo, Akron, Ohio, and Miami. Western Michigan, Central Michigan, Northern Illinois, and Ball State were to be played once each.

Bowling Green opened the season with an exhibition victory over Malone, dominating throughout en route to an 87–60.

November
The Falcons opened the regular season on November 9 with a dominating victory over Division III Earlham College, winning 102–49. Jehvon Clarke led the charge for Bowling Green with 17 points, eight assists, and six steals in the win.

Roster

Schedule and results
Source: 

|-
!colspan=9 style="background:#F5793F; color:#4E2400;"| Exhibition

|-
!colspan=9 style="background:#F5793F; color:#4E2400;"| Non-conference games

|-
!colspan=9 style="background:#F5793F; color:#4E2400;"| Conference games

|-
!colspan=9 style="background:#F5793F; color:#4E2400;"| MAC tournament

References

Bowling Green
Bowling Green Falcons men's basketball seasons